The Kuwait national handball team is controlled by the Kuwait Handball Association. It is highly regarded as one of the most successful national handball teams in Asia and the Arab World. Kuwait has enjoyed great handball success at both the national and club level. The sport is widely considered to be the national icon of Kuwait, although football is more popular among the overall population. Kuwait's golden decade existed from the late 1990s to the late 2000s. Kuwait is also the founding member of the Asian Handball Federation, the Asian Championship and Club Champions League.

On 15 September 2015, the International Handball Federation suspended Kuwait Handball Association.

Results

Summer Olympics
1980 – 12th place
1996 – 12th place

World Championship
1982 – 15th place
1995 – 20th place
1999 – 19th place
2001 – 23rd place
2003 – 20th place
2005 – 22nd place
2007 – 18th place
2009 – 22nd place

Asian Championship

**Gold background color indicates that the tournament was won. Red border color indicates tournament was held on home :soil.
***Following the IOC decision to suspend the NOC of Kuwait which came in force on 1 January 2010, the International Handball Federation decided to suspend handball in Kuwait in all categories.

Asian Games
New Delhi 1982 – 4th
Seoul 1986 – 4th
Hiroshima 1994 – 4th
Bangkok 1998 –  Silver Medal
Busan 2002 –  Silver Medal
Doha 2006 –  Gold Medal
Incheon 2014 – 5th

National coaches
Velimir Kljaić
Tonči Drušković 2014–2016

References

External links

IHF profile

Handball in Kuwait
Men's national handball teams
Handball